Frederick Mason was a British wrestler. He competed in the freestyle heavyweight event at the 1920 Summer Olympics.

References

External links
 

Year of birth missing
Year of death missing
Olympic wrestlers of Great Britain
Wrestlers at the 1920 Summer Olympics
British male sport wrestlers
Place of birth missing